Wafaqi Mohtasib (Federal ombudsman),, is a government department formulated via presidential order I of 1983, during President General Zia ul Haq. The main functions entrusted to Wafaqi Mohtasib were to diagnose, investigate, redress and to rectify any injustice done to public through mal-administration of an agency of the Federal Government.

References

Government of Pakistan